The 107th Fighter Squadron is a unit of the Michigan Air National Guard 127th Wing. It is assigned to Selfridge Air National Guard Base, Michigan and is equipped with the Fairchild Republic A-10 Thunderbolt II aircraft.

The squadron is a descendant organization of the World War I 107th Aero Squadron, established on 27 August 1917. It was reformed on 7 May 1926, as the 107th Observation Squadron, and is one of the 29 original National Guard Observation Squadrons of the United States Army National Guard formed before World War II.

History

World War I
The 107th Fighter Squadron traces its origins to 26 August 1917 with the organization of the 107th Aero Squadron. Forty recruits arrived at Kelly Field, San Antonio, Texas from Vancouver Barracks, Washington. An additional 341 recruits arrived from Fort Thomas, Kentucky, and 110 men and along with the 40 from Vancouver were formed as the 107th. The squadron was initially indoctrinated into military service, performing drill, fatigue duties and also construction work at the field. Once basic indoctrination training was completed, the 107th was ordered for overseas duty, being ordered to report to the Aviation Concentration Center, Garden City, Long Island on 26 October. It was there that final arrangements were made for the trip overseas, complete equipment was drawn and a final few transfers were made.

On 7 December, the 107th was ordered to proceed by train to St. John's, Newfoundland. After a brief rest, the squadron arrived at Southampton, England on the 29th, and crossed the English Channel to Le Havre, France. There, it then traveled by train to the Replacement Concentration Center, American Expeditionary Forces, St. Maixent Replacement Barracks, France, arriving on 2 January 1918. At St. Maixent the squadron was redesignated as the 801st Aero Squadron, and placed on camp duty for nearly two months. Finally, it was ordered to proceed to the Third Aviation Instruction Center at Issoudun Aerodrome, in central France, arriving on 21 February. Initially the squadron was assigned to the main airfield, working in the aircraft assembly and test departments. On 7 June, help was needed at Field No. 2, and the 801st was ordered to send 100 men to help put the field in better shape. Cooperating with another squadron, Field No. 2 was placed on an efficient basis as any field in the AEF.

The squadron remained at Issoudun until after the Armistice with Germany in November 1918, then returned to the United States in March 1919. Arrived at Mitchel Field where the squadron members were demobilized and returned to civilian life.

Intra-war period
After the war the squadron was reorganized in 1925 as the Michigan National Guard's first flying unit, the squadron consisted of 20 officers and 90 enlisted men meeting weekly in a Detroit garage. It received Federal recognition in May 1926 as the air section of the Michigan National Guard's 32d Division. Its primary mission was artillery spotting and observation of troop movements.

In March 1938, elements of the 107th Observation Squadron performed gunnery training at Eglin Field, Florida, for 15 days, deploying from Wayne County Airport at Detroit, Michigan. 23 officers and 111 men arrived on 1 March. One detachment flew in eight aircraft while the rest arrived by rail over the Louisville and Nashville Railroad at Crestview, Florida.

World War II
Called to active duty with Douglas O-38 and North American O-47 observation planes on 15 October 1940, the 107th was sent to DeRidder Army Air Base, Louisiana for unit training on 28 October 1940. For many years this airfield was simply called the Artillery Range Airport Camp.

On 11 April 1941, Lieutenant Wilmer Esler was killed in the crash of his O-47 when it experienced an engine failure on takeoff.
The War Department announced on 19 June 1941 that the Air Corps field at Camp Beauregard would be named Esler Field in honor of his sacrifice.

In 1941, the 107th was joined by two other National Guard observation units to form the 67th Observation Group. The 67th Group did anti-submarine patrolling off the East Coast of the US from mid-December 1941 to March 1942, when it returned to Louisiana for training in fighter aircraft.

The 67th Group was sent to RAF Membury, England, in August 1942 and flew Supermarine Spitfire Mk. Vs and De Havilland Tiger Moths for a year until equipped with North American F-6 Mustangs. Pre-invasion missions began in December 1943. For successful photo missions of the French invasion coastline without loss of a single aircraft, the 107th was awarded the Presidential Unit Citation on 7 April 1945. The 67th Group advance detachments landed in Normandy 13 days after D-Day. The Belgian Fourragere was awarded for conspicuous action during the Battle of the Bulge.

In June 2018, A-10s from the 107th flew over Normandy Beach as part of anniversary observances of D-Day. It was the first official mission for the 107th over Normandy since the end of World War II.

Michigan Air National Guard

The wartime 107th Tactical Reconnaissance Squadron was redesignated as the 107th Bombardment Squadron (Light), and was allotted to the National Guard on 24 May 1946. It was organized at Wayne County Airport, Michigan on 9 June 1946 and was extended federal recognition in September. It was assigned to the newly organized Michigan National Guard's 127th Fighter Group. The squadron was equipped with F-51H Mustang.

In 1950, the unit was converted to Republic F-84B Thunderjet jets and on 1 February 1951, the unit was activated as part of the 127th Pilot Training Group and moved to Luke Air Force Base, Arizona. The 107th was inactivated and returned to Michigan in November 1952.

F-16s from the 107th Fighter Squadron deployed to Kirkuk Air Base in February 2004 to replace the 354th Fighter Squadron. The 107th became the first General Dynamics F-16 Fighting Falcon unit to be based in Iraq. The unit returned home in early June 2004.

As a result of the 2005 Base Realignment and Closure decision, the 107th converted from the F-16 to the Fairchild Republic A-10 Thunderbolt II. The 107th flew its last sortie with F-16s on 16 December 2008. The three remaining F-16s on the base were scheduled to be transferred to Fort Wayne Air National Guard Station, Indiana, and twenty-four A-10s are scheduled to arrive at Selfridge in May 2009.

Distinguished members
Among the distinguished former members of the 107th Fighter Squadron is former World War II 361st Fighter Group ace Urban "Ben" Drew, who was a F-51 instructor pilot assigned to the 107th Fighter Squadron in Detroit from 1947 to 1950. During World War II, while flying a P-51 named "Detroit Miss" Lt. Drew was credited with being the only pilot to shoot down two German Messerschmitt Me 262 jet fighters on a single mission. He was also credited with destroying the sole German Blohm & Voss BV 238 seaplane, the largest aircraft to see service during World War II.

Lineage
 107th Aero Squadron
 Organized as the 107th Aero Squadron on 27 August 1917

 Redesignated: 801st Aero Squadron on 1 February 1918
 Redesignated: 801st Aero Squadron (Repair) on 21 February 1918
 Demobilized on 18 March 1919
 Reconstituted and consolidated with the 107th Observation Squadron as the 107th Observation Squadron on 20 October 1936

 107th Fighter Squadron
 Constituted as the 107th Squadron (Observation) and allotted to the Michigan National Guard in 1921
 Redesignated 107th Observation Squadron on 25 January 1923
 Organized and federally recognized on 7 May 1926
 Consolidated with the 801st Aero Squadron on 20 October 1936
 Ordered to active service on 15 October 1940
 Redesignated 107th Observation Squadron (Light) on 13 January 1942
 Redesignated 107th Observation Squadron on 4 July 1942
 Redesignated 107th Reconnaissance Squadron (Fighter) on 31 May 1943
 Redesignated 107th Tactical Reconnaissance Squadron on 13 November 1943
 Inactivated on 9 November 1945
 Redesignated 107th Bombardment Squadron (Light) and allotted to the National Guard on 24 May 1946
 Activated on 9 July 1946
 Federally recognized 26 September 1946
 Redesignated 107th Fighter Squadron, Jet on 1 July 1950
 Ordered into active service on 1 February 1951
 Redesignated 107th Pilot Training Squadron on 1 February 1951
 Inactivated, relieved from active duty and returned to the National Guard on 1 November 1952
 Redesignated 107th Fighter-Bomber Squadron and activated in the Michigan Air National Guard on 1 November 1952
 Redesignated 107th Fighter-Interceptor Squadron on 1 July 1955
 Redesignated 107th Tactical Reconnaissance Squadron, Photo-Jet on 12 April 1958
 Redesignated 107th Tactical Fighter Squadron on 30 June 1972
 Redesignated 107th Fighter Squadron on 31 March 1992

Assignments
 Post Headquarters, Kelly Field, 27 August 1917
 Aviation Concentration Center, 31 October – 7 December 1917
 Replacement Concentration Center, American Expeditionary Forces, 2 January 1918
 Third Aviation Instruction Center, 21 February 1918
 Services of Supply, American Expeditionary Forces, 4 January–8 March 1919
 Eastern Department, 8–18 Mar 1919
 32d Division Air Service (later Divisional Aviation, 32d Division), 7 May 1926
 Attached to 32d Division, 15 February 1929
 46th Observation Group, 1 October 1933
 Fourth Corps Area 15 October 1940
 V Army Corps, c. December 1940
 67th Observation Group (later 67th Reconnaissance Group, 67th Tactical Reconnaissance Group), 1 September 1941 – 9 November 1945
 127th Fighter Group, 29 September 1946
 66th Fighter Wing, 26 November 1946
 126th Bombardment Group, February 1947
 127th Fighter Group (later 127th Pilot Training Group), c. 1 July 1950 – 1 November 1952
 127th Fighter-Bomber Group (later 127th Fighter-Interceptor Group, 127th Fighter Group, 127th Tactical Reconnaissance Group, 127th Tactical Fighter Group), 1 November 1952
 127th Tactical Fighter Wing (later 127th Fighter Wing), 9 December 1974
 127th Operations Group, c. 1 January 1993 – present

Stations

 Kelly Field, Texas, 27 August 1917
 Hazelhurst Field, New York, c. 31 October-7 December 1917
 St. Maixent Replacement Barracks, France, 2 January 1918
 Issoudun Aerodrome, France, 21 February 1918
 St Nazaire, France, c. 4 January 1919 – 1919
 Garden City, New York, c. 8–18 March 1919
 Detroit Airport, Michigan, 7 May 1926
 Wayne County Airport, Michigan, c. 1929
 DeRidder Army Air Base, Louisiana, 28 October 1940
 Charleston Army Air Base, South Carolina, c. 14 December 1941
 Esler Field, Louisiana, 30 January-12 August 1942
 RAF Membury (AAF-466), England, c. 7 September 1942
 RAF Aldermaston (AAF-467), England, 25 November 1942
 RAF Membury (AAF-466), England, 8 January 1943
 RAF Middle Wallop (AAF-449), England, 11 December 1943

 Deux Jumeaux Airfield (A-4), France, 28 June 1944
 Le Molay Airfield (A-8), France, 5 July 1944
 Toussus-le-Noble Airport (A-46), France, 29 August 1944
 Gosselies Airfield (AAF-184) (A-87), Belgium, 16 September 1944
 Operated from: Chievres Airfield (A-84), Belgium, 7–18 Dec 1944
 Vogelsang Airfield (Y-51), Germany, 23 March 1945
 Limburg Airfield (Y-83), Germany, 4 April 1945
 Eschwege Airfield (R-11), Germany, 9 Apr-5 Ju1 1945
 Drew Field, Florida, 16 September–9 November 1945
 Wayne County Airport, MI, 9 July 1946 – 1 February 1951
 Luke Air Force Base, Arizona, 1 February 1951 – 1 November 1952
 Detroit-Wayne Major Airport, Michigan, 1 November 1952
 Selfridge Air Force Base, (later Selfridge Air National Guard Base), Michigan, July 1971 – present

Aircraft 

 Included Consolidated PT-1, Northrop BT-1, and Douglas O-2 during period 1927–1932
 Douglas O-38, 1931–1941
 In addition to North American O-47, c. 1938–1942, and O-49, 1941–1942
 Included Curtiss O-52 Owl, A-20 Havoc, and P-51A Mustang in 1942
 Supermarine Spitfire Mk.Vb, 1942–1944
 L-4 Grasshopper, 1942–1943
 F-3A Havoc and DB-7 Boston, 1943
 North American F-6B Mustang, 1943–1945
 North American F-51H Mustang, 1946–1950
 F-84 Thunderjet, 1950–1952
 F-51H Mustang, 1951–1952

 F-80 Shooting Star, 1951–1952
 F-84 Thunderjet, 1951–1952
 F-86E Sabre, 1952–1953
 F-89C Scorpion, 1953–1958
 RF-84F Thunderstreak, 1958–1971
 RF-101C Voodoo, 1971–1972
 F-100D Super Sabre, 1972–1978
 A-7D Corsair II, 1979–1989
 General Dynamics F-16 Fighting Falcon, 1989–2008
 Fairchild Republic A-10 Thunderbolt II, 2008–present

See also

 List of American aero squadrons
 List of observation squadrons of the United States Army National Guard

References
 Notes

 Citations

Bibliography

 
 
 
 Hubbard, Gerard (June 1943). "Aircraft Insignia, Spirit of Youth". Vol. LXXXIII (No. 6) National Geographic, pp. 710–722

External links
 127th Wing
 Global Security – 107th Fighter Squadron

Squadrons of the United States Air National Guard
Fighter squadrons of the United States Air Force
Military units and formations in Michigan
Military units and formations established in 1917